Kerkorian is a surname. Notable people with the name include:
 Gary Kerkorian (1930–2000), American football quarterback
 Kirk Kerkorian (1917–2015), American billionaire

See also
 Krikorian (disambiguation)

Armenian-language surnames